The word equip can refer to:

 to equip, to have equipment, ie. tools
 Equip (gaming) in videogames
 EQUIP, an international ministry.
 EquipFM 91.7 MHz WEQP, Rustburg, Virginia, USA; a radio station
 WORK Equip, a model of wheels manufactured by Work Co., Ltd.
 Train-and-equip program, a type of foreign military aid program

See also

 Do not equip (DNE)
 Equippable Abilities
 Going equipped (crime) a British crime
 Equipage
 
 Équipe (disambiguation)